Cape Lyttelton is a cape between Cape Goldie and Shackleton Inlet, forming the southern entrance point of Shackleton Inlet, along the western edge of the Ross Ice Shelf, Antarctica. It was discovered by the British National Antarctic Expedition (1901–04) and named after Lyttelton, New Zealand. The Discovery started on the last lap of its journey south from Lyttelton, where very generous assistance was given the expedition.

References

Headlands of the Ross Dependency
Shackleton Coast